Aldisa zetlandica is a species of sea slug, a dorid nudibranch, a marine gastropod mollusc in the family Cadlinidae.

Distribution 
This species was described from Shetland, United Kingdom. It has subsequently been reported from Ireland, Norway, Sweden, Iceland and the Azores.

References

Cadlinidae
Gastropods described in 1854